Thomas Perronet Thompson (1783–1869), British Parliamentarian, governor of Sierra Leone
 T. P. Thompson, Arizona state senator